NRK P2 is one of three main, nationwide radio channels produced by the Norwegian Broadcasting Corporation (NRK). Its current format – focusing on news and current affairs, debate, analysis, culture, science, and society  – is the result of the NRK radio channel reform initiated in 1993 by radio director Tor Fuglevik. In style and content, the channel is similar to the Danish DR P1 and the Swedish SR P1. The original P2, established as NRK's second radio channel in 1984, had carried lighter programming.

In 1999 the channel's employees were collectively awarded the Fritt Ord Award for their championship of freedom of speech.

The last transmitters radiating P2 on FM were switched off on 13 December 2017, and the channel is now receivable only via digital audio broadcasting (DAB+), satellite TV, and internet.

References

External links
NRK P2 - official home page (in Norwegian)
NRK P2 online radio

1984 establishments in Norway
NRK
Radio stations established in 1984
Radio stations in Norway